David Gillespie (born 1964) is an Australian rugby league player.

David or Dave Gillespie may also refer to:
David Gillespie (politician) (born 1957), Australian politician and gastroenterologist
David Gillespie (murder victim) (died 2004), victim in the House of Blood murders
David Gillespie (actor), British actor who played Duncan Boyd in EastEnders
David Gillespie (author), Australian author of self-help books
Dave Gillespie (Australian footballer) (1887–1917), Australian rules footballer
Dave Gillespie (rugby union) (born 1934), New Zealand rugby union player (All Black)
Dave Gillespie (American football), American football coach